San Pedro Amuzgos  is a town and municipality in Oaxaca in south-western Mexico. It is part of Putla District in the west of the Sierra Sur Region.

References

Municipalities of Oaxaca